The following is a list of mass media in Cleveland, Ohio, United States.

Print

Daily 
The Plain Dealer

Weekly 
Call and Post
Cleveland Jewish News
Cleveland Scene
Crain's Cleveland Business
Sun Newspapers

Monthly 
Alternative Press
Cleveland Magazine
Design World
EHS Today
IndustryWeek

Defunct 
Al-Sahafa
Bérmunkás
The Big Us
Cleveland Free Times
The Cleveland Gazette
The Cleveland Leader
Cleveland News
Cleveland Press
The Daily Cleveland Herald
Homeless Grapevine
Magazine of Western History
The Ohio Farmer
Solidarity

Radio 

Greater Cleveland is currently the 35th largest radio market in the United States, as ranked by Nielsen Media Research. While most stations originate in Cleveland proper, this list includes stations licensed within the counties of Cuyahoga, Lorain, Medina, Lake and Geauga that define the market. Stations licensed to Akron but are specifically marketed to the Cleveland region are also included (Nielsen recognizes Akron and Canton as separate markets).

Currently, radio stations that primarily serve Greater Cleveland include:

AM 

 850 WKNR Cleveland (Sports/ESPN)
 930 WEOL Elyria/Lorain (Talk)
 1100 WTAM Cleveland (Talk)1
 1220 WHKW Cleveland (Christian)
 1260 WCCR Cleveland (Catholic/EWTN)
 1300 WJMO Cleveland (Gospel)
 1320 WOBL Oberlin (Classic country)
 1330 WINT Willoughby (Talk)
 1350 WARF Akron (Sports/Fox)
 1380 WDLW Lorain (Oldies)
 1420 WHK Cleveland (Talk)
 1460 WABQ Painesville (Gospel)
 1490 WERE Cleveland Heights (Talk)

 1 clear-channel station

FM 

 88.3 WBWC Berea (College/alternative rock)*
 88.3 WHWN Painesville (Spanish/variety)*
 88.7 WJCU University Heights (College/variety)*
 89.3 WCSB Cleveland (College/variety)*
 89.7 WKSU Kent (NPR)*
 90.3 WCLV Cleveland (Classical/jazz)*
 91.1 WRUW-FM Cleveland (College/variety)*
 91.5 WKHR Bainbridge (Adult standards/MOR)*
 91.5 WOBC-FM Oberlin (College/variety)*
 92.3 WKRK-FM Cleveland Heights (Sports/CBS)
 93.1 WZAK Cleveland (Urban AC)
 95.5 WFHM-FM Cleveland (Christian contemporary)
 96.5 WAKS Akron (Contemporary hits)
 98.5 WNCX Cleveland (Classic rock)
 99.5 WGAR-FM Cleveland (Country)
 100.7 WMMS Cleveland (Active rock/hot talk)
 102.1 WDOK Cleveland (Adult contemporary)
 103.3 WCRF-FM Cleveland (Christian/Moody)*
 104.1 WQAL Cleveland (Hot AC)
 104.9 WCPN Lorain (NPR–WKSU simulcast)*
 105.7 WMJI Cleveland (Classic hits)
 106.5 WHLK Cleveland (Adult hits)
 107.3 WNWV Elyria (Alternative rock)
 107.9 WENZ Cleveland (Mainstream urban)
(*) - indicates a non-commercial station.

LPFM 
 93.7 WSAV-LP Lorain (Community)*
 95.9 WOVU-LP Cleveland (Community)*

Silent 
 WCCD Parma 
 WWGK Cleveland

Defunct
 KDPM—Cleveland (1921–27)
 WATJ—Chardon (1969–2004)
 WBOE—Cleveland (1938–78; license deleted in 1982)
 WDBK—Cleveland (1924–27; moved to Akron as WFJC, consolidated to form WGAR in 1930)
 WJTB—North Ridgeville (1984–2017)
 WWIZ—Lorain (1958–67)

Programming 

 Wings Over Jordan (1937–47; 1949)
Rover's Morning Glory (2003–05; 2006–present)
 The Maxwell Show (2004–09; 2010–11)
 The Alan Cox Show (2010–present)
 Weekend Radio (1982–present)
 Cleveland Browns Radio Network (1946–96; 1999–present)
 Cavaliers AudioVerse (1970–present)
 Cleveland Guardians Radio Network (1948–present)

TV 

Unlike radio, Cleveland, Akron, and Canton are grouped as a single television market, which is currently ranked by Nielsen Media Research as the 19th-largest television market in the United States. Cleveland was the first city in the U.S. to have all commercial television newscasts produced in high-definition; WJW was the first station to do in December 2004, followed by WKYC on May 22, 2006, WEWS on January 7, 2007, and WOIO on October 20, 2007.

Affiliations listed below are the primary subchannel of each respective station (displayed as x.1 via PSIP). Additional networks/diginets are also available on many of the following stations' secondary subchannels (x.2 and up).

Full-power 
 3 WKYC Cleveland (NBC)
 5 WEWS-TV Cleveland (ABC)
 8 WJW Cleveland (Fox)
 17 WDLI-TV Canton (Bounce)
 19 WOIO Shaker Heights (CBS)
 23 WVPX-TV Akron (Ion)
 25 WVIZ Cleveland (PBS)
 43 WUAB Lorain (The CW)
 47 WRLM Canton (TCT)*
 49 WEAO Akron (PBS)
 55 WBNX-TV Akron (Independent)
 61 WQHS-DT Cleveland (Univision)*

Low-power 
 6 WTCL-LD Cleveland (Telemundo)
 16 WRAP-LD Cleveland (Infomercials)
 20 WQDI-LD Canton (Timeless TV)
 35 WOCV-CD Cleveland (Decades)*
 41 WEKA-LD Canton (Timeless TV)
 53 WCDN-LD Cleveland (Daystar)*

(*) - indicates channel is a network owned-and-operated station.

Cable
Bally Sports Great Lakes
Bally Sports Ohio
Spectrum News 1 (Ohio)

Defunct 

 W41AP—Sandusky (1987–2017)
 WAKN-LP—Akron (1990–2000)
 WAOH-LP—Akron (1990–2017)
 WICA-TV—Ashtabula (1953–56; 1966–67)
 WKBF-TV—Cleveland (1968–75)
 Spectrum Sports (2006–09)

Programming 
The 90 & 9 Club (1985–2019)
Barnaby (1957–67, 1969–90)
Hickory Hideout (1981–91)
Hoolihan & Big Chuck/Big Chuck & Lil' John (1966–2007: new production, 2011–present: "Best of")
Matches 'n Mates (1967–68)
Montage (1965–78)
Popeye Theater with Mister Mac (1968–71)
Shock Theater (Ghoulardi) (1963–66)
The Ghoul (1971–75, 1982–84, 1998–2004)
Supe's On/Mad Theater (Superhost) (1969–89)
The Captain Penny Show (1955–71)
The Mike Douglas Show (1961–65)
The Morning Exchange (1972–99)
Upbeat (1964–71)
Woodrow the Woodsman (1961–72, 1997–2000)

Internet

Publishing 

 Belt Magazine
 Cleveland.com

Defunct 

 oWOW Radio

References

Cleveland